Atilla Özmen (born 11 May 1988) is a Turkish footballer who plays as a goalkeeper for TFF Second League club Isparta 32 SK.

Career
A native of Ayvalık, a seaside town in Balıkesir Province on Turkey's northwestern Aegean coast, Atilla Özmen played football since childhood and, in 1998, at the age of 10, was already a regular at Istanbul youth club, Küçükköy Belediye, where he remained until 2002, when a move, for the 2003–04 season, was arranged to İnegölspor club in nearby Bursa.  The following three seasons (2004–07) were spent at Izmir's club Altay S.K., which has the same jersey colours (black and white) and with which he maintained good relations.  In 2007, he was one of the players traded between Altay and Beşiktaş on loan.  For Bank Asya 1. Lig 2008-09, he joined Altay back again.

Spelled his time at Altay and Konyaspor respectively, he joined another Izmir team Bucaspor, promoted Süper Lig in June 2010.

Following Bucaspor's relegation from Süper Lig, Atilla moved to Samsunspor on 14 July 2011, signing a three-year deal.

He signed for Gaziantep Büyükşehir Belediyespor on 1 July 2014.

References

External links
 
 
 

1988 births
People from Ayvalık
Living people
Turkish footballers
Turkey under-21 international footballers
Turkey youth international footballers
Association football goalkeepers
Altay S.K. footballers
Beşiktaş J.K. footballers
Konyaspor footballers
Bucaspor footballers
Samsunspor footballers
Gaziantep F.K. footballers
İnegölspor footballers
Balıkesirspor footballers
Süper Lig players
TFF First League players
TFF Second League players